Kär och galen is the sixth studio album by Swedish rock artist Ulf Lundell. It was released in October 1982 by EMI. It was produced by Lasse Lindbom, Ulf Lundell and Kjell Andersson.

The album has sold 4× platinum in Sweden and contains Ulf Lundell's most famous song, "Öppna landskap" ("Open landscapes"), which meant his big break to a wider audience. The song was proposed to become Sweden's new national anthem and has been translated into a wide range of languages.

The album was reissued in 1998 in a remastered version with two extra tracks, a demo version of "Öppna landskap" and "Hårt regn".

Track listing

Personnel
 Ulf Lundell - vocals, guitar
 Hasse Olsson - Hammond-orgel
 Janne Bark - guitar
 Pelle Alsing - drums, marimba
 Martin Cerha - bass
 Olle Nyberg - piano, marimba
 Lasse Lindbom - vocals, guitar

Charts

References

1982 albums
Ulf Lundell albums